"I Want to Break Free" is a song by the British rock band Queen, written by their bassist John Deacon. It appears on the album The Works (1984), and was released in three versions: album, single and extended. The track became a staple of the bands during their 1984-85 The Works Tour and their 1986 Magic Tour. 

The song is largely known for its music video for which all the band members dressed in drag, a concept proposed by drummer Roger Taylor, which parodied the long-running ITV soap opera Coronation Street. The second part of the video included a composition rehearsed and performed with the Royal Ballet and choreographed by Wayne Eagling. Whereas the parody was acclaimed in the United Kingdom, where cross-dressing is a popular trope in British comedy, it caused controversy in the United States.

After its release in 1984, the song was well received in Europe and South America and is regarded as an anthem of the fight against oppression. The single reached only number 45 on the US Billboard Hot 100, but reached number three in the UK and was certified Platinum with over 600,000 copies sold/equivalent streams. It also topped the charts of Austria, Belgium, and the Netherlands. The song features on the band's compilation album, Greatest Hits II.

Composition and background
The song was written in 1983 by John Deacon and released in April 1984. Most of the song follows a traditional 12 bar blues progression in E major. It has three verses with one bridge, no chorus, and relatively little section repetition. 

The song features session musician Fred Mandel, who plays all of the keyboard parts; he was involved with the song when it featured only a drum machine and a guitar part. The keyboard solo was done in one take on a Roland Jupiter-8 synthesizer, except the last note with a portamento down one octave, which was captured via punching in. 

Besides the album version, a single version and an extended version were released.

The single version lasts 4 minutes 21 seconds and differs from the album version by the 40-second introduction and a longer synthesizer solo which starts at 2:33. The introduction is played on an electronic keyboard and is assisted by cymbals, drums and a guitar (Red Special). For the Bohemian Rhapsody soundtrack the single introduction is added to the album version creating a 3 minutes 43 seconds edit.

The extended version lasts 7 minutes 16 seconds and features a longer introduction and ending. It lasts until 6:04, and the remaining minute contains fragments of other songs from The Works. The extended version was mostly distributed as 12-inch vinyl records and then reissued on the CD of The Works in 1991.

Besides The Works, the song was featured in the albums Greatest Hits II, Box of Tricks, Greatest Hits (1992 US 'Red' edition) and Absolute Greatest and in the box-sets The Complete Works  and The Platinum Collection.

Distribution
The song became the second single from the album The Works, after "Radio Ga Ga". The single was released on 2 April 1984 on 7-inch and 12-inch records and later as 3-inch and 5-inch CDs.

The 7-inch records were distributed in 16 countries. In most countries, the A-side features the extended version of "I've Got to Break Free" while the B-side contains the album version of the song "Machines (or 'Back to Humans')".  The US and Canadian releases feature an instrumental version of "Machines" as the B-side, while Brazil features "It's a Hard Life".  In Argentina, the song was released as "Quiero Ser Libre".

The UK 3-inch CD single features "I Want to Break Free" (album version), "Machines" and "It's a Hard Life". In Germany, the 5-inch CD single contains "I Want to Break Free" and "It's a Hard Life", as well as the video of "I Want to Break Free".

Single covers feature pictures of the group from the cover of the album The Works. In countries where the single went in four different versions, each version has a picture of one Queen member, otherwise four images were placed together. The inscription "Queen. I Want to Break Free" is red, white, gold or black and the frame is red or white. The German 5-inch CD uses the cover for the "Radio Ga Ga" single. The reverse side is the same – a photo of the group on a red background, except for CDs which had a white background and no pictures.

Reception
Cash Box said that the refrain is "catchy". Smash Hits said, "After the masterly pop production of "Radio Ga Ga" comes a big, fat dud: an unfinished song (loosely borrowed from Shirley Bassey's ancient hit "What Now My Love", an absurd guitar solo and half-hearted performances from all bar Freddie."

Chart performance
The single was received very positively over most of the world except for North America. In April 1984, it became number three in the United Kingdom, and was within the top 10 in many European and Latin American countries, but only peaked at number 45 on the US charts. The single was certified platinum in the UK. MTV and some other US stations' minimal airing of the video played a role in the low US ranking. The video was included in 1991 on VH1's My Generation two-part episode devoted to Queen hosted by guitarist Brian May. According to May in an interview about Queen's Greatest Hits, whereas the video was understood and taken as a joke in the UK, the US audience failed to see the soap-opera connection. According to Taylor, MTV "was a very narrow-minded station then. It just seemed to be all fucking Whitesnake". "It was a measure of the...thinking, MTV, that they...thought it was disgraceful, and didn't show it, and banned it".

In some other countries, such as South Africa and in South America, the song was highly praised because it was seen as an anthem of the fight against oppression, whereas the reaction to the video was mixed.

Live performances
After the release of The Works, the song was performed at almost all of Queen's live concerts. Live recordings of the song appeared on the concert albums Live Magic, Live at Wembley '86 and Return of the Champions. In addition, the song was performed at several concerts which were then included in Queen's videos such as Queen at Wembley, We Are the Champions: Final Live in Japan, The Freddie Mercury Tribute Concert and Return of the Champions.

Lisa Stansfield led the song in The Freddie Mercury Tribute Concert. The song was also performed in many concerts of the project Queen + Paul Rodgers, where Paul Rodgers took vocals, Danny Miranda played bass guitar and Spike Edney was at the keyboard.

Music video

Following in the tradition of cross-dressing in British comedy, the music video for "I Want to Break Free" sees the members of Queen in a suburban house dressed as women, a parody of the characters from the ITV soap opera Coronation Street.

The video opens with a scene of typical British residential streets in the morning, intercut with shots of a teasmade waking Brian May's character up. The terraced houses are located in Leeds, in the neighbourhood Harehills. The roof of a terrace, most likely between Sandhurst Terrace and Dorset Road, can be seen in the opening shot. In the second scene the camera pans along a terrace and stops at the house where the action supposedly happens. It is located on 41 Dorset Mount in real life and has a slightly different floor plan than the set used in the video. A part of the Dorset Mount street name plate can be seen on its wall just a second before Brian May gets out of bed.

Mercury vacuums the floor and sings the first verse. He opens a door leading to a dark space, where the group appear surrounded by figures wearing miner's helmets. Mercury dances to a glowing box and reappears with several dancers dressed in spotted leotards, and perform a dance. In the house, Mercury sings and goes upstairs. The group appear in the dark space again.

Production
The "I Want to Break Free" music video was directed by David Mallet. It was shot on 22 March and 4 May 1984 at Limehouse Studios.

The Coronation Street spoof was "[s]uggested by Taylor's then-girlfriend Dominique". Recounts Roger Taylor: "We had done some really serious, epic videos in the past, and we just thought we'd have some fun. We wanted people to know that we didn't take ourselves too seriously, that we could still laugh at ourselves. I think we proved that." "I thought what character to make Fred? And I thought Liverpudlian slag is the answer".

Mercury's character was loosely based on Coronation Street barmaid Bet Lynch, who wants to "break free" from her life. Although Lynch was a blonde, Mercury thought he would look too silly as a blonde and chose a dark wig. He wears a black wig, pink earrings, a tight-fitting sleeveless pink top with sizable false breasts (with black bra straps showing), black leather miniskirt, thigh-high black stockings, and High-heeled shoes. No attempt was made to disguise Mercury's then-trademark moustache, adding further to the comical effect. During rehearsals, Mercury realised that he could not walk freely in very high heels and settled on 2-inch ones. May plays a more dowdy housewife, with rollers in his hair, based loosely on Hilda Ogden. Deacon appears as a conservative old "grandma", while Taylor plays a schoolgirl with long blonde hair who, like Mercury's character, wants a different life.

The composition was choreographed by Wayne Eagling, a friend of Mercury who had helped him with the choreography of "Bohemian Rhapsody". Eagling was then a leader of the Royal Ballet which was involved in the video. Mercury shaved his moustache in reference to Vaslav Nijinsky as the faun in the ballet L'après-midi d'un faune. The shooting took much practice, especially the conveyor rolling part. According to Eagling, despite being a natural performer on stage, Mercury could not stand performing any choreographed act himself, which is why he was mostly picked up and moved around in the ballet part of the video. The rehearsals with the Royal Ballet were organised by Eagling secretly from his superiors, something that placed him in serious trouble when discovered later.

Track listings
7" single
A side. "I Want to Break Free" (single version) – 4:18
B side. "Machines (or 'Back to Humans')" – 5:07

12" single
A side. "I Want to Break Free" (extended version) – 7:14
B side. "Machines (or 'Back to Humans')" – 5:07

Personnel
Freddie Mercury – vocals
Brian May – electric lead guitar
Roger Taylor – electronic drums
John Deacon – bass guitar, electric and acoustic rhythm guitars
Fred Mandel – synthesizers

Charts and certifications

Weekly charts

Year-end charts

Certifications

Notes

References

Bibliography

External links
 Official YouTube videos: original music video

Queen (band) songs
1984 singles
1984 songs
British synth-pop songs
Capitol Records singles
Coronation Street
Songs about cross-dressing
Dutch Top 40 number-one singles
EMI Records singles
European Hot 100 Singles number-one singles
Hollywood Records singles
LGBT-related songs
Music video controversies
Music videos directed by David Mallet (director)
Number-one singles in Austria
Number-one singles in Belgium
Number-one singles in South Africa
Song recordings produced by Reinhold Mack
Songs written by John Deacon